La Vieja River is a river in the Colombian departments of Quindío, Valle del Cauca and Risaralda.   It is a major tributary of the Cauca River.

The river is formed by the joining of the Quindío River and the Barragán River in an area known as the Valle de Maravelez. Major tributaries include the Roble, Consota, Barbas, Espejo and Pijao rivers. La Vieja forms the limit between the departments of Quindío and Valle del Cauca; it also forms part of the limit between Risaralda and Valle del Cauca.

Although Cartago is the only major urban area situated directly on the river, the cities of Armenia and Pereira are located in its watershed.

Recreational use of the river includes the increasingly popular tourist activity balsaje, in which groups of up to 16 people explore the slow-flowing river in large rafts made of guadua.  The majority of these excursions depart from Puerto Samaria in the municipality of Montenegro, Quindío, and arrive at Puerto Alejandrino in neighboring Quimbaya.  The number of participants has grown from 400 during 2000 to over 11,000 in 2003, and there are at least a dozen firms offering this service.

La Vieja has significant contamination problems, primarily due to inadequate waste water treatment in its watershed.

References 

Corporación Autónoma Regional del Quindío (2005), Proyecto Ordenacion y Manejo de la Cuenca del Río La Vieja (in Spanish)

Rivers of Colombia